Bir Ma'in was a Palestinian Arab village in the Ramle Subdistrict. It was depopulated during the 1948 Arab-Israeli War on July 15, 1948 during the second phase of Operation Danny by the First and Second Battalions of the Yiftach Brigade. It was located 14 km east of Ramla. The village was defended by the Jordanian Army.

Foundation legend
In 1873, Clermont-Ganneau noted down the foundation legend of Bir_Ma'in. He was told that the village mosque was consecrated to its founder, Neby Ma'in, son of Jacob. He was buried in a cave nearby. When he died, his five sisters hurried to Bir Ma'in from Jiser Benat Ya'kub ('Jacob Daughters' Bridge'). However, they all died at different places in the neighbourhood, and were buried where they died. Their tombs were still an object of veneration, Sitt Mena being one of them.

History

Crusader period
Bir Ma'in was a fief of the Holy Sepulchre Church in the twelfth century. In 1170, Bernhard, Bishop of Lydda, granted the leaders of the Holy Sepulchre Church the right to build churches in five villages, including Bir Ma'in. It is unclear if a church was ever built. 

At the time of the Crusades there was a fort here, which was destroyed by Saladin, and rebuilt by Richard Lionheart.

Ottoman period
Bir Ma'in was incorporated into the Ottoman Empire in 1517 with all of Palestine, and in 1596 it appeared in the tax registers being in the nahiya ("subdistrict") of Ramla, which was under the administration of the Gaza Sanjak. It had a population of 30 household; an estimated 165 persons, who were all Muslims. They paid a fixed tax-rate of 25 % on agricultural products, including wheat, barley, summer crops, olive trees, sesame, goats and beehives, in addition to occasional revenues and a press for olive oil or grape syrup; a total of 3,500 akçe. All of the revenues went to a Waqf.

In 1838, Bir Am'in was noted as a Muslim village in the Lydda District.

In 1863 Victor Guérin described it as a village of a hundred or more inhabitants, located on a hill. He noted that ancient stones, lying on the ground, proved that this hamlet once had a certain importance.

An Ottoman village list of about 1870 showed that Bir Main had 12 houses and a population of 90, though the population count included men, only.

In 1873, Clermont-Ganneau noted down the legend connecting the village to the son and daughters of Yakub, the Muslim version of biblical Jacob (see #Foundation legend section).

In 1883, the PEF's Survey of Western Palestine described Bir Main as "A small hamlet on high ground, with a well about half a mile south-east."

British Mandate
In the 1922 census of Palestine conducted by the British Mandate authorities, Bir Ma'in had a population of 289 inhabitants; all Muslims, increasing in the 1931 census when Bir Imma'in had 355 Muslim inhabitants, in a total of 85 houses.

In 1934, an elementary school was founded in the village. 

In 1944/45 statistics the village had a population of 510 Muslims, while the total land area was 9,319 dunams, according to an official land and population survey. Of this, 176 dunums of village land were irrigated or used for plantations, 2,880 dunums were for cereals, while 9 dunams were classified as built-up areas.

The village also had its own mosque. Three khirbats are located in the village.

1948, aftermath
Bir Ma'in became depopulated during the 1948 Arab-Israeli War on July 15, 1948 during the second phase of Operation Danny by the First and Second Battalions of the Yiftach Brigade.

The Israeli military settlement of Makkabim was established on village land in 1986.

In 1992 the remains were described: "Two deserted buildings with crumbling walls can be seen on the site ... Part of the surrounding land is used for target practice and other Israeli military purposes, and part of it is cultivated by Israeli farmers."

In 2002, a book about the village was published in Jordan.

See also
Daughters of Jacob Bridge on the Jordan, associated with biblical Jacob due to a misunderstanding
Jacob's Well, site associated with biblical Jacob in Samaritan and Christian tradition
Jubb Yussef (Joseph's Well), site associated with biblical Joseph in Muslim tradition

References

Bibliography

 
 
 
 
 

Khadar, Shafiq 'Eid. 2002. Qaryat Bir Ma'in: Al-Hilm wal-haqiqa [Bir Ma'in village: The dream and the reality]. Jordan:

External links
Welcome To Bir Ma'in 
Bir Ma'in, Zochrot
Survey of Western Palestine, Map 17: IAA, Wikimedia commons

Arab villages depopulated during the 1948 Arab–Israeli War
District of Ramla